Muhammad Taqi Abdul Halim (born in Christiansted, Saint Croix, U.S. Virgin Islands) is an American athlete. Halim is a graduate of Charles D'Amico High School in Albion, NY where he shattered school records in track and field. Halim was recruited by, and attended Cornell University, following strong performances as a member of Albion's varsity track team. He graduated from Cornell University in 2008, at which point he started a career as a financial analyst, while continuing to train vigorously in various track and field events. At the 2010 Central American and Caribbean Games, he won a silver medal in the men's long jump event. He also broke the territory's men's triple jump record at the 2011 MSU Legacy with 16.61 metres, also his personal best. Halim competed in the Men's triple jump event at the 2012 Summer Olympics but was eliminated in the first round.

Personal bests

Achievements

References

External links

Sports reference biography
Tilastopaja biography

1986 births
Living people
Cornell University alumni
Pan American Games competitors for the United States Virgin Islands
Olympic track and field athletes of the United States Virgin Islands
United States Virgin Islands long jumpers
United States Virgin Islands triple jumpers
Athletes (track and field) at the 2011 Pan American Games
Athletes (track and field) at the 2012 Summer Olympics
Athletes (track and field) at the 2016 Summer Olympics
People from Saint Croix, U.S. Virgin Islands
United States Virgin Islands male track and field athletes
Olympic male triple jumpers
Male triple jumpers
Central American and Caribbean Games silver medalists for the United States Virgin Islands
Competitors at the 2010 Central American and Caribbean Games
Competitors at the 2014 Central American and Caribbean Games
Central American and Caribbean Games medalists in athletics